Gojko Berkuljan (Montenegrin: Gojko Berkuljan; Nikšić, September 6, 1923 – Cetinje, December 21, 1989) was a Montenegrin painter of Romanian origin. He was born in Nikšić but his family moved to Cetinje, former administrative center of Montenegro, where he attended elementary and high school. Gojko Berkuljan graduated in 1950 from the School of Arts in Herceg Novi, where he studied painting in the class of professors Milo Milunović and Petar Lubarda. The director of this institution at the time was Milos Vusković, distinguished painter and caricaturist. During the studies Berkuljan participated in preservation and copying of the frescoes in the Patriarchate of Peć and other monasteries located in Serbia, Montenegro and Macedonia. After graduation, he worked for a couple of years as technical director of the journal Pobjeda (Victory) and conservator for paintings on canvass at the Institute for Protection of the Monuments of History in Cetinje. In 1951 he formed together with his friends and colleagues Branko Filipović and Aleksandar Prijić the artistic group “Trojica”. Their works based on non-common approach were commented as a rebellion against socialist realism and other artistic stereotypes of the period. In 1952 Berkuljan started to work as scenographist at the oldest Montenegrin Theatre “Zetski Dom” and the “Theatre for children Rajko Begovič”, where he designed more than 200 paintings of the stage scenery. Before getting retired he also covered briefly the position of the general manager of the National Theatre of Montenegro in Podgorica.
Gojko Berkuljan participated in all most important events related to the Montenegrin art scene.  He was also initiator and one of the founders of the international exhibition “Salon 13 November” and initiator of the former Museum of Theatre in Cetinje. During the years the artist created a large number of paintings that evolved radically in form and substance through different techniques and phases, mostly inspired by Montenegrin landscape and epics.
Berkuljan won many awards and obtained two scholarships: for specialization in Italy (1954) and France (1959). He was a member of ULUCG (Association of Visual Artists of Montenegro).

References
1. Pavle Vasić, Jubilarna izložba crnogorskih umjetnika (In occasion of the jubilee exhibition of Montenegrin painters), Politika (Serbian newspaper Politika), 28. 11. 1956.

2. Dragutin Vujanović, Predgovor u katalogu za izložbu Gojka Berkuljana (From the preface to the catalogue), Radnički univerzitet «Nikola Kovačević», Nikšić 1972.

3. Milan Marović, Predgovor u katalogu za izložbu (From the preface to the catalogue), Umjetnička galerija Crne Gore, Cetinje 1973.

4. Olga Perović, Ovdje (Former Montenegrin art magazine), September 1973.

5. Mladen Lompar, Gojko Berkuljan – katalog retrospektivne izložbe (From the catalogue published in occasion of Berkuljan’s retrospective), Umjetnički muzej SR Crne Gore Cetinje, jul-August 1977.

6. Milo Kralj, Stvaralaštvo je stalno traženje (The creativity represents the continuous seeking), Borba (Serbian newspaper Borba), 9. 04. 1977.

7. Opća enciklopedija JLZ – treće izdanje, tom II, str 151 (Third version, vol. II, page 151), Zagreb 1977.

8. Anton Zadrima, Crnogorski slikari i vajari (Montenegrin painters and sculptors), Književna opština Cetinje, 1986.

9. Olga Perović, Ogledi i kritike (Opinions and art criticism), Centar savremene umjetnosti Crne Gore, Podgorica, 1997.

10. Milan M. Marović, Prostor/vrijeme/trajanje – crnogorska likovna kritika (Space/time/existence – Montenegrin art criticism), Centar savremene umjetnosti Crne Gore, Podgorica, 2000.

Artists from Cetinje
Montenegrin painters
Yugoslav painters
1989 deaths
1923 births
Yugoslav expatriates in Italy
Yugoslav expatriates in France